Emanuel Reynoso (born 1 February 1983 in Mendoza) is an Argentine football striker. He currently plays for Deportivo Maipú of the Torneo Argentino A of Argentina.

Reynoso started playing in Godoy Cruz, where it passes in each of the lower divisions, and made his debut in 2001.

In 2003, Reynosa went to Club Atlético Juventud Unida of the Torneo Argentino A equivalent to the Third Division Argentina, then march to Deportivo Maipú of the Torneo Argentino B, which is contained.

He did this after playing in the Universidad de Concepción of the First Division of Chile, where he was top scorer of the team.

He went by Deportivo Azogues in Ecuador, where he played in the Ecuadorian championship 2008.

In 2008, he returned to Deportivo Maipú.

External links
 BDFA profile

1983 births
Living people
Sportspeople from Mendoza, Argentina
Argentine footballers
Association football forwards
Argentine expatriate footballers
Godoy Cruz Antonio Tomba footballers
Universidad de Concepción footballers
Huracán de Tres Arroyos footballers
Chilean Primera División players
Expatriate footballers in Chile
Expatriate footballers in Ecuador